Heinrich Ratjen (20 November 1918 – 22 April 2008), born Dora Ratjen, was a German athlete who competed for Germany in the women's high jump at the 1936 Summer Olympics at Berlin, finishing fourth, but was later determined to be male and/or intersex. In some news reports, he was erroneously referred to as Hermann Ratjen and Horst Ratjen.

Life
A file containing the findings of an investigation conducted in 1938 and 1939 into Ratjen's life was made public by Der Spiegel in 2009.

Ratjen was born in Erichshof, near Bremen, into a family described as "simple folk".  The father, Heinrich Ratjen, stated in 1938: "When the child was born the midwife called over to me, 'Heini, it's a boy!' But five minutes later she said to me, 'It is a girl, after all.  Nine months later, when the child, who had been christened Dora, was ill, a doctor examined the child's genitalia and, according to Heinrich, said "Let it be. You can't do anything about it anyway." Dora stated, also in 1938: "My parents brought me up as a girl [and] I therefore wore girl's clothes all my childhood. But from the age of 10 or 11 I started to realize I wasn't female, but male. However I never asked my parents why I had to wear women's clothes even though I was male."

In his teens, Dora began competing successfully as a girl at sports, apparently being "too embarrassed to talk about what was happening to him". In 1936, he took part in the Olympics, his teammate Gretel Bergmann stating: "I never had any suspicions, not even once... In the communal shower we wondered why she never showed herself naked. It was grotesque that someone could still be that shy at the age of 17. We just thought, 'She's strange. She's odd'... But no-one knew or noticed anything about her different sexuality."

In 1939, he broke the world record in the high jump. But Dorothy Tyler-Odam was suspicious of Ratjen, saying, "They wrote to me telling me I didn't hold the record, so I wrote to them saying, 'She's not a woman, she's a man'. They did some research and found 'her' serving as a waiter called Hermann Ratjen. So I got my world record back." Odam's world record was formally recognized by the sport's world governing body, the IAAF, in 1957.

Gender controversy
On 21 September 1938, Ratjen took an express train from Vienna to Cologne. The conductor of the train reported to the police at the station in Magdeburg that there was "a man dressed as a woman" on the train. Ratjen was ordered off the train and questioned by the police. He showed his genuine documents which said he was a woman, but after some hesitation, admitted to being a man and told his story. A physician was summoned and after an examination pronounced Ratjen to be male. However, the physician described Ratjen's intersex genitalia as having a "coarse scarred stripe", and stated his opinion that with this organ sexual intercourse would be impossible.

The athlete was arrested, and sent to Hohenlychen sports sanatorium for further tests, with the same results. Criminal proceedings continued until 10 March 1939, when the public prosecutor stated: "Fraud cannot be deemed to have taken place because there was no intention to reap financial reward." Dora promised the authorities he would "cease engaging in sport with immediate effect". The athlete's father, Heinrich Ratjen, initially insisted that Dora should continue to be treated as female but on 29 March 1939 wrote to the police chief of Bremen: "Following the change of the registry office entry regarding the child's sex, I would request you change the child's first name to Heinrich."  The gold medal won by Ratjen was returned and his name expunged from the records.

Later life and confusion
According to Der Spiegel, Dora, then Heinrich Ratjen, who later called himself Heinz, was issued a new ID and work papers and taken to Hanover by the Reichsarbeitsdienst "as a working man".  He later took over the running of his parents' bar, refusing requests for interviews before his death in 2008.

However, in 1966, Time magazine reported that, in 1957, Dora had presented as Hermann, a waiter in Bremen, "who tearfully confessed that he had been forced by the Nazis to pose as a woman 'for the sake of the honor and glory of Germany'. Sighed Hermann: 'For three years I lived the life of a girl. It was most dull.

In 2009, the film Berlin 36 presented a fictionalised version of the story presented by Time magazine.  In the version of Ratjen's story presented as background to the movie, the Nazis supposedly wanted to ensure that Hitler would not be embarrassed by a Jewish athlete winning a gold medal for Germany at the Olympics, and Gretel Bergmann was replaced in the team by Ratjen. In 1938, Ratjen was supposedly then disqualified after the European Championships when a doctor discovered that he had strapped up his genitals. Asked for comment following the movie's release, Bergmann said she had "no idea" why Ratjen did what he did.

Der Spiegel disputed the assertion that Ratjen was a tool of the Nazis, as presented by Time and the movie, stating:

See also
Gender verification in sports
Intersex rights in Germany

References

1918 births
2008 deaths
Athletes (track and field) at the 1936 Summer Olympics
Sex verification in sports
Intersex sportspeople
Intersex men
German high jumpers
Olympic athletes of Germany
Cheating in sports
Sportspeople from Bremen
German LGBT sportspeople
LGBT track and field athletes
Reich Labour Service members
20th-century German LGBT people